The 2014–15 Georgian Cup (also known as the David Kipiani Cup) was the eightieth season overall and the twenty-five since independence of the Georgian annual football tournament. The competition began on 19 August 2014 and finished on 26 May 2014. The defending champions are Dinamo Tbilisi, after winning their eleventh Georgian Cup last season. The winner of the competition qualified for the second qualifying round of the 2015–16 UEFA Europa League.

First round 
The first legs were held on 19 and 20 August, with the return matches from 16 September.

|}

First legs

Second round 
The first legs were held on 17 and 18 November, with the return matches on 25 and 26 November.

|}

Quarterfinals 

The first legs were held on 18 February, with the return matches on 9 March.

|}

Semi-finals
The first legs were held on 7 April, with the return matches on 28 April.

|}

Final

See also 
 2014–15 Umaglesi Liga
 2014–15 Pirveli Liga

References

External links
 Official site 

Georgian Cup seasons
Cup
Georgian Cup